Volha is a feminine Belarusian given name, a variation of the name Olga (Olha). It can also be a surname (a variation of Volga). 

Notable carriers include:

Volha Khizhynkova (born 1986), Belarusian pageant contestant and model
Volha Krautsova (born 1981), Belarusian long-distance runner
Volha Sudarava (born 1984), Belarusian long jumper
Volha Tsander (born 1976), Belarusian hammer thrower
Volha Zinkevich (born 1975), Belarusian paralympic athlete
Vasyl Volha (born 1968), Ukrainian politician

Belarusian feminine given names